Auletta  is a genus of sponges in the family Bubaridae.

List of species 
This genus contains the following 16 species:
 Auletta akaroa Cavalcanti, Recinos & Pinheiro, 2017
 Auletta andamanensis Pattanayak, 2006
 Auletta aurantiaca Dendy, 1889
 Auletta consimilis Thiele, 1898
 Auletta dendrophora Wilson, 1904
 Auletta elongata Dendy, 1905
 Auletta grantioides Lévi & Vacelet, 1958
 Auletta halichondroides Thiele, 1898
 Auletta krautteri Austin, Ott, Reiswig, Romagosa & McDaniel, 2013
 Auletta laboreli Cavalcanti, Recinos & Pinheiro, 2017
 Auletta lyrata (Esper, 1794)
 Auletta pedunculata (Topsent, 1896)
 Auletta sessilis Topsent, 1904
 Auletta sycinularia Schmidt, 1870
 Auletta tuberosa Alvarez, van Soest & Rützler, 1998
 Auletta tubulosa (Ridley & Dendy, 1886)

References

Sponges
Sponge genera
Taxa named by Eduard Oscar Schmidt